Nikola Mandić (born 19 March 1995) is a Croatian professional footballer who plays as a forward for Bosnian Premier League club Zrinjski Mostar.

Honours
Krupa
First League of RS: 2019–20

References

External links

1995 births
Living people
Sportspeople from Vinkovci
Association football forwards
Croatian footballers
Croatia youth international footballers
NK Osijek players
HNK Cibalia players
NK Dugopolje players
NK Krško players
FK Krupa players
FK Rudar Prijedor players
HŠK Zrinjski Mostar players
Croatian Football League players
First Football League (Croatia) players
Slovenian PrvaLiga players
Premier League of Bosnia and Herzegovina players
First League of the Republika Srpska players
Croatian expatriate footballers
Expatriate footballers in Slovenia
Croatian expatriate sportspeople in Slovenia
Expatriate footballers in Bosnia and Herzegovina
Croatian expatriate sportspeople in Bosnia and Herzegovina